Franklin Sixth Form College is a sixth form college on Chelmsford Avenue in Grimsby, North East Lincolnshire, England, serving more than 2,700 students, including adult learners.

Location

One of 92 sixth form colleges in England, Franklin College is situated west of Grimsby town centre, in the Grange area of the town. It is located on Chelmsford Avenue, which can be accessed from Laceby Road (A46). The Grimsby Institute's East Coast School of Art, and the Ormiston Maritime Academy (previously known as Hereford Technology School), are located down the adjacent Westward Ho.

Admissions
While Franklin College is primarily for students aged 16–19 who want to study for A levels, mature students are also welcome to enrol, and evening classes are available, some based throughout Grimsby and Cleethorpes. It currently serves in excess of 1,700 full-time students aged 16–18 from the whole of North East Lincolnshire and surrounding areas, in addition to more than a thousand adult learners aged 19 or over.

History
Founded in September 1990 by Humberside County Council, Franklin College was named after two councillors, Jack and Florence Franklin, who had devoted much time to the area. Nearby city Kingston upon Hull had gained two sixth form colleges the year before. The first principal was Peter Newcome, who retired in late 2009 and was replaced by  principal Trevor Wray. The current principal is now Peter Kennedy. The college site had at one time been occupied by Chelmsford Secondary Modern School before its closure.

Initially planned to be a small sixth form with about 450 students due to low further education uptake in the area, the college has exceeded that number and currently serves more than 1,700 full-time students aged 16–18.

It was initially run by Humberside Education Committee until 1993, then administered by the FEFC. Following the FEFC's abolition in 2001, the college was run by the newly formed Yorkshire LSC, which was itself replaced by the YPLA in April 2010. The YPLA was abolished in 2012 and replaced with the Education Funding Agency and the Skills Funding Agency. Both the EFA and SFA were abolished in March 2017 and their responsibilities transferred to the Education and Skills Funding Agency. Humberside was abolished in 1996, and the college now resides within the region of North East Lincolnshire LEA, but is not part of or controlled by the authority.

Academic record
The report published by Ofsted following an inspection of the college in 2008 describes school success rate as "consistently at or above the national average at all levels for all ages", and rated the college as Grade 2 (good) in all six criteria (effectiveness of provision, capacity to improve, achievement and standards, quality of provision, leadership and management, and equality of opportunity).

In 2009 the college came first in North East Lincolnshire for points per student. 

In 2011, 100% of students left the college with at least two A levels or equivalent qualifications, and 95% achieved the equivalent of three A level passes. 41.2% of A level entries in 2010 earned A*–B grades. This breaks down as 24.1% B grades, 12.7% A grades, and 4.4% A* grades. The average UCAS Tariff point score per student upon graduation was 349.75. For comparison, the same year 8.1% of all A level entries were awarded an A* grade, 18.9% received an A, and 25.2% received a B. This places Franklin College below the national average.

Facilities
Since 2003, the college has had an incorporated nursery, located at the front of the college and run by For Under Fives, both for students with children and the general public.

In 2007, the college opened a new £1 million art block, equipped for subjects such as art and photography.

Franklin College also possesses a library and study area that provides a wide selection of fiction and non-fiction books and DVDs. Previously called the Learning Resource Centre (LRC), this was renovated and renamed the Learning Centre in late 2011.

Construction of a new £1 million extension, consisting of classrooms for IT and health on the college site, began in November 2011, and is ongoing as of February 2012.

Notable alumni
Keeley Donovan – BBC weather forecaster who studied media at Franklin
 Melanie Onn, Labour MP for Great Grimsby since 2015
Matthew Stiff – opera singer and former member of G4

Notes

References

External links

 Website

Educational institutions established in 1990
Buildings and structures in Grimsby
Sixth form colleges in Lincolnshire
1990 establishments in England
Education in the Borough of North East Lincolnshire
Education in Grimsby